Leiostracus vittatus is a species of tropical air-breathing land snail, a terrestrial pulmonate gastropod mollusk in the family Simpulopsidae.

References

Simpulopsidae
Endemic fauna of Brazil
Leiostracus
Gastropods described in 1827